String Quartet in B♭ major may refer to one of two string quartets by Beethoven:

 String Quartet No. 6 (Beethoven), Opus 18 Number 6 
 String Quartet No. 13 (Beethoven), Opus 130

See also
 Grosse Fuge, Opus 133, originally the final movement of Quartet No. 13